This is a list of years in Cuba.

21st century

20th century

 
History of Cuba
Cuba